Swimming injuries have many different causes, which can occur immediate or can occur as the result of a long-term swimming career. Some ways that swimmers can increase the risk of an injury are by overuse of a specific part of the body, lacking crucial flexibility and strength, etc. These injuries, like swimmer’s shoulder and breaststroker’s knee, cause pain to the swimmer in certain regions that permit necessary movement for the required precise technique. Although these injuries can halt a professional swimmer’s career, many can be treated and some can even be prevented. There are different procedures and exercises that can either prevent an injury or help with recovering from an injury. Many of the exercises are specific to the injury and vary in helpfulness according to the person and the technique used for the exercise.

Compared to athletes who play other sports, competitive swimmers are at higher than average risk of overuse injuries and injuries caused by early sports specialization among children and teenagers.

Swimmer's shoulder 

Swimmers shoulder is the name given to a broad range of shoulder injuries that occur in swimmers and results in pain felt within the shoulder and in areas surrounding the shoulder, including down the arm and up the neck. Pain associated with swimmers shoulder often starts as an irritating niggle when swim training and can persist to intense pain while swim training and also a constant pain while resting.

While there are a number of contributing factor leading to the development of swimmers shoulder, it is believed that the two main causes of swimmers shoulder are overuse and the biomechanics of the stroke also known as stroke technique.

The first cause of swimmers shoulder is overuse. Overuse of the shoulder muscles and surrounding muscles can lead to fatigue of the muscles. Due to the muscles being fatigued they are in a weakened state and with continuous use will therefore work less effectively when swimming and will result in the swimmer having to work the shoulder muscles twice as hard by taking double the number of strokes they would usually take in order to cover the same distance. This would ultimately result in more fatigue and inflammation of the muscles. Unilateral breathing may also cause swimmers shoulder due to the fact that the opposite shoulder to the breathing arm has to work harder to support balanced position and forward movement while the head is turned.  Some training equipment such as paddles and kick boards can also put stress on the shoulder and surrounding muscles and cause fatigue and inflammation.

The second cause of swimmer shoulder is the biomechanics of the stroke also known as stroke technique. Incorrect stroke technique for example the swimmers hand entering the water across the mid-line of the swimmers body then proceeding to stroke back or the swimmers hand entering the water palm out thumb down and any other type of incorrect technique when done repetitively can cause pain, fatigue and inflammation of the shoulder and surrounding muscles.

Treatment methods 

Some treatment methods include; warming up slowly prior to training, avoiding strokes and positions that cause pain (butterfly/freestyle), fixing any bad technique that could be causing the pain, adjusting the distance and frequency of training to avoid further overuse of the muscles, discontinue the use of paddles, increase kick sets to allow the shoulder to rest however limit the use of kickboards and avoid pulling sets. Increase the use of fins to assist with maintaining a good body position and to avoid drag, avoid dry land upper body weight training, ice the shoulder daily, consider the use of anti-inflammatory creams and medicines and seek the advice of a medical professional.

Breaststroker's knee 
Breaststroker’s knee is the name given to pain felt within and around the knee that is experienced by swimmers. It is named this due to the fact it is most commonly only breaststrokers that experience pain within the knee and around the knee. Most swimmer will have no problems with their knees however ‘the majority (86%) of breaststroke swimmers will have experienced knee pain at one point in their career and 47.2% of them will have had this problem at least one time every week.’ 

There are several factors that increase the swimmers chances of developing knee pain and inflammation of the knee muscles such as, the increasing age of the swimmer, the length of the competitive career, the length of the event, inadequate warm-up, strength imbalance of hip abductors/adductors and flexibility imbalance of hip abductors/adductors.

Prevention and treatment 
In order to prevent the development of knee pain and inflammation of the knee muscles it is recommended that swimmers use a well-designed strength and stretching program, warm-up adequately, use correct breaststroke kick technique, gradually build up the distance of breaststroke swimming and have a balanced training program that focuses on not only breaststroke and also has training sessions that allows for adequate recovery of the knee muscles to prevent fatigue of the muscles causing overuse, inflammation and pain.

Treatment of breaststroker’s knee includes resting the knee muscles, icing daily, elevating the limb, strengthening and stretching, support e.g. strapping or knee braces, seeking medical advice which can lead to physiotherapy, cortisone injections and in few cases surgery.

References

Sports injuries
Swimming
Swimming culture